A list of notable Polish politicians of the Democratic Left Alliance party.

A
 Waldemar Achramowicz
 Bartosz Arłukowicz

B
 Marek Belka
 Robert Biedroń
 Barbara Blida
 Marek Borowski
 Anita Błochowiak

C
 Andrzej Celiński
 Kazimierz Chrzanowski
 Grażyna Ciemniak
 Bronisław Cieślak
 Włodzimierz Cimoszewicz
 Eugeniusz Czykwin

D
 Jolanta Danielak

G
 Piotr Gadzinowski
 Tomasz Garbowski
 Lidia Geringer d'Oedenberg
 Witold Gintowt-Dziewałtowski
 Bogdan Golik
 Henryk Gołębiewski
 Genowefa Grabowska

H
 Jerzy Hausner

I
 Tadeusz Iwiński

J
 Ewa Janik
 Krzysztof Janik
 Elżbieta Jankowska
 Stanisław Jarmoliński
 Sławomir Jeneralski
 Wiesław Jędrusik

K
 Anna Kalata
 Ryszard Kalisz
 Romuald Kosieniak
 Janusz Krasoń
 Aleksander Krawczuk
 Janusz Kubicki
 Jerzy Kulej
 Grzegorz Kurczuk
 Aleksander Kwaśniewski

L
 Grzegorz Lato
 Sandra Lewandowska
 Bogusław Liberadzki
 Krystian Łuczak
 Krystyna Łybacka

M
 Jacek Majchrowski
 Janusz Maksymiuk
 Stanisław Maliszewski
 Krzysztof Martens
 Wacław Martyniuk
 Krzysztof Matyjaszczyk
 Henryk Milcarz
 Leszek Miller
 Tadeusz Motowidło

N
 Grzegorz Napieralski
 Tomasz Nałęcz

O
 Wojciech Olejniczak
 Józef Oleksy
 Artur Ostrowski

P
 Jerzy Passendorfer
 Longin Pastusiak
 Sylwester Pawłowski
 Wojciech Pawłowski
 Jacek Piechota
 Katarzyna Piekarska
 Stanisław Piosik
 Zbigniew Podraza
 Wojciech Pomajda
 Stanisława Prządka

R
 Mieczysław Rakowski
 Dariusz Rosati
 Stanisław Rydzoń

S
 Joanna Senyszyn
 Zbigniew Siemiątkowski
 Izabella Sierakowska
 Marek Siwiec
 Szczepan Skomra
 Stanisław Stec
 Marek Strzaliński
 Władysław Stępień
 Włodzimierz Stępień
 Wiesław Szczepański
 Andrzej Szejna
 Jerzy Szmajdziński
 Jan Szwarc
 Jolanta Szymanek-Deresz
 Lech Szymańczyk
 Maria Szyszkowska

T
 Michał Tober
 Tadeusz Tomaszewski
 Ryszard Tomczyk

U
 Jerzy Urban

W
 Jerzy Wenderlich
 Jerzy Wiatr
 Marek Wikiński
 Zenon Wiśniewski
 Bogusław Wontor
 Grzegorz Woźny
 Stanisław Wziątek
 Janusz Wójcik

Z
 Zbyszek Zaborowski
 Michał Zaleski
 Ryszard Zbrzyzny
 Janusz Zemke
 Zbigniew Zychowicz

 
Democratic Left Alliance